{{Infobox television
| image = Pepito Manaloto title card.jpg
| caption = Title card since June 2022
| alt_name = {{plainlist|
 Pepito Manaloto: Ang Tunay na Kuwento
 Pepito Manaloto: Kuwento Kuwento
 Pepito Manaloto: Ang Unang Kuwento
 Pepito Manaloto: Tuloy ang Kuwento}}
| genre = Sitcom
| runtime = 40 minutes
| creator = Michael V.
| director = 

| creative_director = Michael V.
| executive_producer = Roy San Luis
| starring = 
| endtheme =  
| composer = Michael V.
| theme_music_composer = Albert Tamayo
| country = Philippines
| language = Tagalog
| network = GMA Network
| company = GMA Entertainment Group
| picture_format = 
| audio_format = 5.1 surround sound
| camera = Multiple-camera setup
| first_aired = 
| last_aired = present
}}Pepito Manaloto: Tuloy ang Kuwento formerly known as Pepito Manaloto, Pepito Manaloto: Ang Tunay na Kwento, Pepito Manoloto: Kuwento Kuwento and Pepito Manaloto: Ang Unang Kuwento, is a Philippine television sitcom series broadcast by GMA Network. Directed by Michael V., it stars Michael V. and Sef Cadayona in the title role. It premiered on March 28, 2010, as Pepito Manaloto on the network's Sunday night line up.

It was relaunched on September 16, 2012, as Pepito Manoloto: Ang Tunay na Kuwento. While Pepito Manaloto: Kuwento Kuwento was aired on October 17, 2020, and concluded on May 29, 2021. A prequel series, Pepito Manaloto: Ang Unang Kuwento was launched on July 17, 2021, and concluded on June 4, 2022. Pepito Manaloto: Tuloy Ang Kuwento, started airing on June 11, 2022 which featured the return of the original cast.

The series was released on DVD by GMA Home Video. It is also streaming online on YouTube.

Premise
The show follows the life of Pepito Manoloto, who was blessed and won the lottery. Along with him are his wife Elsa; their son and daughter, Chito and Clarissa; Pepito's best friend Patrick; their employees, Maria, Robert and Baby; and their neighbors, Tommy, Deedee and Mimi.

Cast and characters

Lead cast
 Michael V. and Sef Cadayona  as Pepito "Pitoy" Manaloto
 Manilyn Reynes and Mikee Quintos  as Elsa dela Cruz-Manaloto
 Jake Vargas as Luisito "Chito" dela Cruz Manaloto / Michael "Jordan" Castillo
 Angel Satsumi as Clarissa dela Cruz Manaloto

Supporting cast
 John Feir and Kokoy de Santos  as Patricio "Patrick" Generoso
 Ronnie Henares and Gabby Eigenmann  as Tomas "Tommy" Diones
 Arthur Solinap as Robert "Bert" Maceda
 Mosang as Bettina "Baby" Reyes
 Janna Dominguez as Maria Bagtikan-Cruz
 Nova Villa as Mimi Kho
 Chariz Solomon as Janice Generoso
 Jen Rosendahl as Roberta "Berta" Santos
 Maureen Larrazabal as Mara Quijanos
 Toni Lopena as Vincent Bautista
 Cherry Malvar as Tere Dalisay

Former cast
 Jessa Zaragoza as Deedee Kho
 Pokwang  as Tarsing Batumbakal
 Gladys Reyes  as Rosa Generoso
 Archie Alemania  as Benito "Benny" Manaloto
 Edgar Allan Guzman  as Fernando "Nando" Generoso
 Kristofer Martin  as Wendell
 Jay Arcilla  as Eric
 Denise Barbacena  as Elma
 Angel Guardian  as Beth
 Carmina Villarroel as Maricar Del Valle
 Julie Anne San Jose as Nicollete "Nikki" Villamil Manalotto
 Mikoy Morales as Rosauro "Roxy" Ocampo
 Barbie Forteza as Katkat Natata 
 Jak Roberto as Erik Natata
 Joshua Pineda as young Chito Manaloto (season 1)
 Joshua Dionisio as Richard Reyes (season 1)
 Freddie Webb as Freddie Del Valle (season 1) and Roger (season 2)
 Bayani Agbayani as Brando (season 1)
 Lexi Fernandez and Bea Binene as Erika/Stephanie (season 1–2)

Production
Principal photography was halted in March 2020 due to the enhanced community quarantine in Luzon caused by the COVID-19 pandemic. The show resumed its programming on September 5, 2020. Principal photography for Pepito Manaloto: Ang Unang Kuwento commenced in June 2021.

Ratings
According to AGB Nielsen Philippines' Mega Manila household television ratings, the pilot episode of Pepito Manaloto earned a 28.2% rating. While the first episode of the show as Pepito Manaloto: Ang Tunay na Kuwento scored a 26.6% rating. The pilot episode of Pepito Manaloto: Ang Unang Kuwento'' a 14.7% rating from Nationwide Urban Television Audience Measurement.

Accolades

References

External links
 
 

2010 Philippine television series debuts
2020s Philippine television series
Filipino-language television shows
GMA Network original programming
Philippine comedy television series
Philippine television sitcoms
Television productions suspended due to the COVID-19 pandemic
Television shows set in the Philippines